The 1926 Georgia Tech Golden Tornado football team represented the Georgia Tech Golden Tornado of the Georgia Institute of Technology during the 1926 Southern Conference football season. The Tornado was coached by William Alexander in his seventh year as head coach, compiling a record of 4–5.

Before the season
Doug Wycoff had graduated.

Schedule

Season summary

Oglethorpe

Sources:

The season opened with a great upset and perhaps the greatest victory in the history of the Oglethorpe Stormy Petrels when they downed Tech 7–6. Halfback "Cy" Bell ran for a 42-yard touchdown run, and "Nutty" Campbell got the game-winning extra point. After the game, Oglethorpe fans reacted to the victory by staging a spontaneous parade through downtown Atlanta.

The starting lineup was Irwin (left end), Gaston (left tackle), Lillard (left guard), Poole (center), Drennon (right guard), Hood (right tackle), Hearn (right end), McRae (quarterback), Brewer (left halfback), Parham (right halfback), Holland (fullback)

VMI
In the second week of play, Tech shutout VMI 13–0. The starting lineup was Marshall (left end), Tharpe (left tackle), Martin (left guard), Poole (center), Angley (right guard), Hood (right tackle), Crowley (right end), McRae (quarterback), Smith (left halfback), Barron (right halfback), Murray (fullback)

Tulane
Tech edged Tulane 9–6. The starting lineup was Crowley (left end), Tharpe (left tackle), Martin (left guard), Poole (center), Angley (right guard), Hood (right tackle), Marshall (right end), Brewer (quarterback), Parham (left halfback), Barron (right halfback), Murray (fullback).

Alabama
Wallace Wade's national champion Alabama Crimson Tide surprised and held Georgia Tech to two first downs in a 21–0 victory. Hoyt Winslett passed for all three touchdowns.

The starting lineup was Crowley (left end), Tharpe (left tackle), Martin (left guard), Pund (center), Angley (right guard), Hood (right tackle), Marshall (right end), McRae (quarterback), Smith (left halfback), Reed (right halfback), Murray (fullback).

Washington and Lee
Tech beat the Washington & Lee Generals 19–7.

Notre Dame

Knute Rockne's undefeated Notre Dame beat Tech 12–0. Red Barron stood out in the cold weather.

Vanderbilt

Sources:

Vanderbilt beat Georgia Tech 13–7. Tech scored on an off-tackle play when Carter Barron got loose for a 50-yard run. Bill Spears faked a pass and ran for 24 yards to spark a drive to tie the game at 7, and added two field goals to beat the Tornado.

The starting lineup was Crowley (left end), Tharpe (left tackle), Martin (left guard), Poole (center), Lillard (right guard), Thrash (right tackle), Marshall (right end), Randolph (quarterback), Horn (left halfback), Barron (right halfback), Murray (fullback).

Georgia
Down 13 to 0 at the half, rival Georgia came back to beat Tech. Herdis McCrary and captain George Morton made the touchdowns.

The starting lineup was Crowley (left end), Hood (left tackle), Martin (left guard), Poole (center), Angley (right guard), Tharpe (right tackle), Marshall (right end), Brewer (quarterback), Parham (left halfback), Horn (right halfback), Murray (fullback).

Auburn
In the annual rivalry matchup, Tech beat Auburn 20–7. The starting lineup was Erwin (left end), Tharpe (left tackle), Martin (left guard), Poole (center), Drennon (right guard), Hood (right tackle), Marshall (right end), Brewer (quarterback), Parham (left halfback), Barron (right halfback), Murray (fullback).

Players

Depth chart
The following chart provides a visual depiction of Tech's lineup during the 1924 season with games started at the position reflected in parenthesis. The chart mimics the offense after the jump shift has taken place.

Notes

Endnotes

References
 
 

Georgia Tech
Georgia Tech Yellow Jackets football seasons
Georgia Tech Golden Tornado football
1920s in Atlanta